Deliver Me may refer to:

 Deliver Me (TV series), an American medical reality series
 "Deliver Me" (song), a 1996 song by the Beloved, covered by Sarah Brightman in 1999
 Deliver Me (film), also known as Délivrez-moi, a 2006 drama film directed by Denis Chouinard
 The Kid with a Bike, also known as Délivrez-moi, a 2011 drama film directed by Jean-Pierre and Luc Dardenne
 "Deliver Me", a song by Def Leppard from Slang
 "Deliver Me", a song by INXS from The Greatest Hits
 "Deliver Me", a song by Parkway Drive from Deep Blue
 "Deliver Me", a song by Roch Voisine from Kissing Rain
 "Deliver Me", a song by Tom Petty & The Heartbreakers from Long After Dark

See also
 Psalm 59